Ladies and Gentlemen may refer to:

 Ladies and gentlemen (salutation), a common introductory phrase

Film and television 
 Ladies & Gentlemen (2015 film), a Telugu film
 Ladies & Gentlemen (TV series), a 2021 Bangladeshi drama series
 Ladies and Gentlemen (Comedy Showcase), a 2007 one-off British comedy special
 "Ladies and Gentlemen" (Master of None), a 2015 television episode

Music

Albums 
 Ladies and Gentlemen (Lou Bega album), 2001
 Ladies and Gentlemen (Marcia Hines album), 1977
 Ladies & Gentlemen: The Best of George Michael, 1998
 Ladies & Gentlemen: The Songs of George Michael, by Anthony Callea, 2014
 Ladies and Gentlemen: Barenaked Ladies and The Persuasions, 2017
 Ladies and Gentlemen... Mr. B.B. King, 2012
 Ladies and Gentlemen... The Bangles!, 2014
 Ladies and Gentlemen... the Grateful Dead, 2000
 Ladies & Gentlemen, by the Infamous Stringdusters, 2016

 Songs 
 "Ladies and Gentlemen" (song), by Saliva, 2006
 "Ladies and Gentlemen", by City and Colour from The Hurry and the Harm, 2013
 "Ladies & Gentlemen", by Short Stack from Stack Is the New Black, 2009

 Videos 
 Ladies & Gentlemen: The Best of George Michael (DVD), 1999
 Ladies and Gentlemen: The Rolling Stones, a 1974 concert movie

 Other 
 Ladies and Gentlemen (play), a 1939 play by Charles MacArthur and Ben Hecht
 Ladies & Gentlemen, the company at the centre of the 2009 Enten controversy

 See also 
 
 
 Ladies and Gentleman, a 2013 Malayalam film
 Lady and Gent, a 1932 American film
 Lady & Gentlemen'', a 2011 album by LeAnn Rimes